Abraliopsis is a genus of squid in the family Enoploteuthidae comprising 11 nominal species. Species are characterised by the presence of photophores on arm pair IV. Suckers are absent from this arm. The type species is Abraliopsis hoylei.

Species
The following species are listed as members of the genus Abraliopsis:

Subgenus Abraliopsis Joubin, 1896
Abraliopsis hoylei (Pfeffer, 1884)
Abraliopsis morisii (Vérany, 1839), Pfeffer's enope squid 
Abraliopsis pacificus  Tsuchiya & Okutani, 1990
Abraliopsis tui Riddell, 1985
Subgenus Boreabraliopsis Tsuchiya & Okutani, 1988
Abraliopsis felis McGowan & Okutani, 1968
Subgenus Micrabralia Pfeffer, 1900
Abraliopsis gilchristi Robson, 1924
Abraliopsis lineata Goodrich, 1896
Subgenus Pfefferiteuthis Tsuchiya & Okutani, 1988
Abraliopsis affinis (Pfeffer, 1912)
Abraliopsis atlantica Nesis, 1982
Abraliopsis chuni  Nesis, 1982
Abraliopsis falco  Young, 1972

References

External links
Tree of Life web project: Abraliopsis

 
Cephalopod genera
Bioluminescent molluscs